The women's team competition in archery at the 2022 Mediterranean Games was held from 29 June to 1 July at the Annex Stadium of the Olympic Complex  in Oran.

Qualification round
Results after 216 arrows.

Elimination round
Source:

References

Women's team
Mediterranean Games